Chance Kraig Ruffin (born September 8, 1988) is an American former professional baseball pitcher who played for the Seattle Mariners and Detroit Tigers of Major League Baseball.

Professional career

Detroit Tigers
Ruffin was drafted by the Detroit Tigers in the first round of the 2010 Major League Baseball Draft out of the University of Texas at Austin.

Ruffin was called up and made his Major League debut on July 25, 2011.

Seattle Mariners
On August 17, 2011, Ruffin was sent to the Mariners to complete an earlier trade for Doug Fister and David Pauley.

Ruffin was designated for assignment on December 18, 2013, after the signing of outfielder Franklin Gutierrez. He was not claimed on waivers, and was outrighted to AAA Tacoma.

Following AAA Tacoma's game on July 4, 2014, Ruffin retired suddenly from baseball.

Personal life
His father Bruce Ruffin, played in the major leagues from 1987 to 1997.

See also

List of second-generation Major League Baseball players

References

External links

Texas Longhorns bio

1988 births
Living people
Baseball players from Austin, Texas
Major League Baseball pitchers
Detroit Tigers players
Seattle Mariners players
Texas Longhorns baseball players
Erie SeaWolves players
Toledo Mud Hens players
Tacoma Rainiers players
Jackson Generals (Southern League) players
All-American college baseball players